Monmouth Council, BSA, established in 1917, serves all of Monmouth County, New Jersey and part of Middlesex County, New Jersey. The Council was the starting point for the landmark US Supreme Court case Boy Scouts of America v. Dale.

Organization
The council is divided into 4 districts:
Battleground District
Middlesex District
Thunderbird District
Twin Lights District

Forestburg Scout Reservation

Forestburg Scout Reservation (FSR) is a Boy Scout Camp located in Forestburgh, New York. This is in Sullivan County. The property is owned by Monmouth Council, New Jersey and offers year-round camping in two distinct but connected camps, the J. Fred Billett Camp and the Dan Beard Camp.

History
The first summer camp session at Forestburg was held in 1956, following the initial land purchase of the  estate of Dr. Thomas Darlington, former Health Commissioner for New York City. The camp nearly doubled in size in 1965 with an additional purchase of the  Metauk Rod & Gun Club.

Geography
The three most notable features of the reservation are Burnt Hope Lake, Tecumseh Rock and Darlington Falls. Burnt Hope Lake is a manmade lake originally named Hope Lake, after the Hope Lumber Company, but renamed after fires in 1805 and 1864 put the company out of business.

Programs

Forestburg features programs in different areas- Waterfront, which includes swimming and boating on Burnt Hope Lake, Scoutcraft, which features pioneering and outdoor skills, Handicraft, which is where skills in creating things are taught, Field Sports, which has shooting-related merit badges, Environmental Conservation, where classes dealing with nature are taught, Technology Center, which teaches science related badges and houses the W2FSR amateur radio station, and Frontier Camp, where the newest scouts work towards Tenderfoot, Second Class and First Class Ranks. Unlike its brother camp, FSR does not feature a "theme".

Quail Hill Scout Reservation

Until 1964 when Monmouth Council purchased the Quail Hill property from sisters Elizabeth and Grace LeValley, it was a working farm. Early maps show barns, a corn crib, and orchards on the property, and even today foundation stones from the old buildings can be seen. The property was intended to replace Camp Housman, the council’s in-council camp since the 1940s. Camp Housman was too small and swampy for the kind of programs the council wanted to implement, including extensive training courses and enhanced Cub Scout camping and activities.

Chet Fromm was tapped to develop the LeValley sister’s farm into a proper Boy Scout camp. Chet was a former Army man who had been director of training at Housman and a District Executive as well. He served as the first Ranger until retirement in 1983. Subsequent Rangers have been George Leidy, John Herlihy, Randy Blades, Jim Mechkowski and currently, Adam Schumard.

Between 1964 and 1967 the camp roads and parking lots were constructed, the Webelos and Scout lodges were built, the pond was enlarged to its present size, the campfire bowl was created, and the all-faiths chapel was built. Also, grass seed was sown in the farm fields to create the activities fields we have today.

Quail Hill was formally dedicated on October 7, 1967. That weekend was also the huge council camporee, the first activity held at Quail Hill. So many people showed up that cars were parked all the way out to Route 33.

Later additions to the camp included the pool and shower house, the Ranger's house and shops, renovation of the farm’s garage to become Devlin Lodge, BB and archery ranges, and program shelters at the Webelos lodge and Scout lodge. More recently, the Lawrence Training Center and Lass Lodge and a flush toilet facility have been added to the camp. Lass Lodge is built on the site of the original LeValley farmhouse, demolished in the late 1990s.

In 1975 the Na Tsi Hi lodge opened the Battle of Monmouth Historic Trail. The eleven mile trail, which begins at Quail Hill, takes hikers to many important points in western Monmouth county relating to the important 1778 Revolutionary War battle, and finally ends in historic Freehold, the county seat of Monmouth. Scout units hike the trail Saturdays between Labor Day and Memorial Day.

Quail Hill was the first camp in the Northeast Region to offer a Cub Scout day camp, and it continues that tradition to the present day with an exciting summer program featuring both day and resident (overnight) camping for Cubs and Webelos. Throughout the remainder of the year, thousands of Boy Scouts and Cub Scouts participate in Klondike derbies, camporees, Order of the Arrow events, unit campouts, courts of honor, campfires, picnics, and training courses at Quail Hill. There is not a single weekend when something isn’t happening at Quail Hill.

In 2012, Quail Hill Scout Reservation lost over 1,000 trees and its facilities were significantly damaged by Hurricane Sandy. In response, Scout Troops in the Council aided with a mass cleanup.

Prior Campgrounds
In 1924, The Monmouth County BSA was presented a donation of $5000 by Mrs. George Housman.  Camp Burton was a Monmouth Council summer campsite located in Ocean County on the south side of the Metedeeonk river. When the Allaire campground became available, Camp Burton property was dissolved. The name Camp Burton was formed in memory of Mrs. Housman's son, George Burton. In 1930, Camp Burton is sold to Van Ness Corp.

In 1929, the Monmouth Council BSA rented "Camp Burton at Allaire". This campground was on the property of the current Allaire state park village. The council had a 21-year lease for $1 a year from Arthur Brisbane. However, following his death the lease was not renewed and the campground reverted to estate.

Na Tsi Hi Lodge

The Order of the Arrow is represented by the Na Tsi Hi Lodge, one of eleven lodges in Section E17. It supports the Scouting programs of the Monmouth Council through leadership, camping, and service. The history of the lodge can be found here: http://www.natsihi.org/heritage/lodge-history/.

References

Local councils of the Boy Scouts of America
Monmouth County, New Jersey
Youth organizations established in 1917
Northeast Region (Boy Scouts of America)
1917 establishments in New Jersey